Transit is a novel by German writer Anna Seghers, set in Vichy Marseilles after France fell to Nazi Germany. Written in German, it was published in English in 1944, and has also been translated into other languages.

It has been described as an "existential, political, literary thriller" about storytelling, boredom and exile.

Plot summary
The novel takes place in France during World War II after the German invasion and occupation of the north. The twenty-seven year-old unnamed narrator has escaped from a Nazi concentration camp and is traveling from Rouen. Along the way to Marseilles, where he hopes to get passage on a ship to leave the country, he meets a friend, Paul. Paul asks the narrator to deliver a letter to a writer named Weidel in Paris. When the narrator tries to do this, he learns that Weidel has committed suicide. The narrator also finds that Weidel left behind a suitcase full of letters and an unfinished manuscript for a novel, which he takes with him.

Arriving in Marseilles, the narrator describes the chaos of a town full of people from across Europe who are desperate to escape the Nazis. Most of his time is spent in cafes, where he begins to recognize people who are also waiting, while the city has ever more limited amounts of food and alcohol on sale because of the increased population. A mystery woman who haunts the cafes is Weidel's estranged wife, desperate for his help to leave France. She doesn't know Weidel is dead. The narrator falls in love with her and tries to arrange matters so she can leave with him, without her knowing that he has assumed Weidel's identity (in order to use his visa and Mexican visa).

Throughout the novel, the narrator talks with several other refugees, sharing stories and experiences along the way. The story draws on Seghers's own experience in wartime France.

Publication history
Written in German, it was published in an English translation by James Austin Galston in 1944. It has since been translated into other languages. It was published by the New York Review of Books in 2013 in a new English translation by Margot Bettauer Dembo, as part of its Classics program.

Reception

Film adaptation
In 2018, German director Christian Petzold adapted the novel as a  film of the same name. He transposed the plot to the twenty-first century in some respects, using contemporary settings and ambiguous references to political issues. It is still set in Marseilles, a major center of North African migrants to France, and now also a transit point of refugees from other countries seeking asylum and resettlement in the West.

Bibliography

References

1942 German novels
Novels set during World War II
Novels set in France
Novels by Anna Seghers
German novels adapted into films